Jack Henry Abbott (January 21, 1944 – February 10, 2002) was an American criminal and author. With a long history of criminal convictions, Abbott's writing concerning his life and experiences was lauded by a number of well-known literary critics, including author Norman Mailer. Due partly to lobbying by Mailer and others on Abbott's behalf, Abbott was released from prison in 1981 where he was serving sentences for forgery, manslaughter, and bank robbery. Abbott's memoir In the Belly of the Beast was published with positive reviews soon after his release. Six weeks after being paroled from prison, Abbott stabbed and killed a waiter outside a New York City cafe. Abbott was convicted and sent back to prison, where he killed himself in 2002.

Abbott described his life as being a "state-raised convict", spending much of his life since age 12 in confinement in state facilities, including solitary confinement. He wrote that because of confinement with other violent offenders from whom he could not escape, he developed a subjective perspective that every encounter was potentially threatening.

Early life
Abbott was born on January 21, 1944, at Camp Skeel in Oscoda, Michigan, to an Irish-American soldier and a Chinese-American prostitute. In his book, In the Belly of the Beast (1981), he said he had been in foster care intermittently from the time of his birth until the age of nine, at which time he started "serving long stints in juvenile detention quarters". As a child, Abbott was in trouble with teachers and later with the law, and by the age of 16 was sent to a long-term reform institution, the Utah State Industrial School. According to Abbott, his mistreatment by the school guards left him maladjusted for life.

Prison and release
In 1965, aged 21, Abbott was serving a sentence for forgery in a Utah prison when he stabbed another inmate to death. He was given a sentence of three to 23 years for this offense, and in 1971 his sentence was increased by 19 years after he escaped and committed a bank robbery in Colorado. In prison, he was rebellious and spent much time in solitary confinement.

In 1977, Abbott read that author Norman Mailer was writing about convicted killer Gary Gilmore. Abbott wrote to Mailer, alleging that Gilmore was largely embellishing his experiences, and offered to write about his time in prison in order to provide a more factual depiction of life in prison. Mailer agreed and helped to publish In the Belly of the Beast, a book concerning life in the prison system consisting of Abbott's letters to Mailer.

Mailer endorsed Abbott's attempts to gain parole. Abbott was released to parole in June 1981, despite the misgivings of prison officials, one of whom questioned Abbott's mental state and whether he was rehabilitated, saying, "I thought ... that Mr. Abbott was a dangerous individual ... I didn't see a changed man. His attitude, his demeanor indicated psychosis." After leaving prison, Abbott went to a halfway house in New York City and made the acquaintance of some of Mailer's literary friends.

Manslaughter and return to prison
At about 5 a.m. on July 18, 1981, six weeks after being paroled from prison, Abbott and two women, Véronique de St. André and Susan Roxas, went to a small cafe named the Binibon, located at 79 Second Avenue in Manhattan. Richard Adan, the owner's 22-year-old playwright/actor son-in-law, was there working as a waiter. Abbott got up from his table and asked Adan to direct him to the bathroom. Adan explained that the bathroom could be accessed only through the kitchen, and because the restaurant did not have accident insurance for customers, only employees could use the bathroom. Abbott argued with him. Adan led him outside to a dumpster, on 5th St, outside the restaurant, to urinate, and Abbott stabbed Adan to death. The next day, unaware of Abbott's crime, the New York Times published Anatole Broyard's review of In the Belly of the Beast.

Fleeing to Louisiana, after some time in hiding, Abbott was recognized by a business owner, and he was detained until the police arrived to arrest him in Morgan City, Louisiana. Abbott was working as a roughneck in an oilfield. He was charged with Adan's murder and represented by a well-known defense attorney, Ivan Fisher. At his trial in January 1982, Abbott gained the endorsement of such celebrities as writer Jerzy Kosinski. He was convicted of manslaughter but acquitted of murder, and sentenced to 15 years to life.

Apart from the advance fee of $12,500, Abbott did not receive any revenue from In the Belly of the Beast. Adan's widow successfully sued Abbott for $7.5 million in damages, which meant she would receive all the money from the book's sales.

Mailer was criticized for his role in getting Abbott released and was accused of being so impressed by Abbott's evident writing talent that he did not consider the man's violent nature. In a 1992 interview in The Buffalo News, Mailer said that his involvement with Abbott was "another episode in my life in which I can find nothing to cheer about or nothing to take pride in". Kosinski admitted that their advocacy of Abbott was, in essence, "a fraud.”

Later years and death
Abbott's second book, My Return (1987), was not as popular as In the Belly of the Beast.

In 2001, Abbott appeared before the parole board. His application was denied because of his failure to express remorse, his lengthy criminal record, and his disciplinary problems in prison.

On February 10, 2002, Jack Abbott hanged himself in his prison cell using a makeshift noose constructed from his bedsheets and shoelaces. He left a suicide note, the contents of which have not been made public.

Views
Abbott claimed that his incarceration from the ages of 12 to 18 was the result of "not adjusting well to foster homes", and his indeterminate sentence of up to five years for "issuing a check for insufficient funds" when he was 18 was another example of a system that criminalizes and harshly punishes those it deems unfit for society.

In both his books, Abbott argues that society must reckon with its treatment of prisoners and that the prison system is fundamentally flawed, in that it treats prisoners like sub-human creatures. In In the Belly of the Beast he describes the helplessness that he says prisoners feel while at the mercy of a prison system that is seemingly never held accountable for its actions. He also hints at the subtle yet devastating effect prisons have on the whole of society. Abbott says:

We have no legal rights as prisoners, only as citizens. The only 'rights' we have are those left to their 'discretion'. So we assert our rights the only way we can. It is a compromise, and in the end, I greatly fear we as prisoners will lose—- but the loss will be society's loss. We are only a few steps removed from society. After us, come you.

Psychologist Robert D. Hare described Abbott as displaying the lack of conscience and empathy typical of psychopaths. When asked in a segment for the television news series A Current Affair if he felt remorse for stabbing Adan, Abbott replied: "Remorse implies you did something wrong... If I'm the one who stabbed him, it was an accident."<ref>Hare, Robert. D. (1993) Without Conscience: The Disturbing World of the Psychopaths Among Us. NY: The Guildford Press</ref> Abbott also repeatedly insulted Adan's wife in court, claimed his victim had "no future as an actor" and, despite his claims that he was "railroaded," he also asserted that "There was no pain, it was a clean wound".

In popular culture
In 1983, the Trinity Rep Theatre in Providence, Rhode Island produced an adaptation of In the Belly of the Beast. It was directed by Adrian Hall and featured Richard Jenkins as Abbott.
Nick Cave and the Bad Seeds' song "Jack's Shadow" from the album Your Funeral... My Trial (1986) was inspired by Abbott.
The Australian film Ghosts... of the Civil Dead (1988) was inspired by Abbott's life.
Portions of In the Belly of the Beast were used in the movie Shambondama Elegy (1999), also known as Tokyo Elegy, by Ian Kerkhof.
In 2004, a New York theater company produced In the Belly of the Beast Revisited, a play based on Abbott's first book.
In 2009, the play Binibon by Elliott Sharp and Jack Womack was presented in New York at The Kitchen, based on the 1981 killing of Richard Adan at the Binibon cafe.
The Law & Order season 13 episode "Genius" is based on Abbott's case.
In Psycho II, the character of Mary Samuels (Meg Tilly) can be seen reading In the Belly of the Beast. The book is later seen abandoned in the dust outside the Bates Motel.
In the 1987 movie Stakeout, the character of Richard Montgomery (Aidan Quinn) has the book In the Belly of the Beast in his prison cell.

See also
Jack Unterweger, an Austrian murderer who became a celebrated author of an autobiography discussing prison life while in prison and was then released and became a serial killer; after being convicted of another nine murders, he committed suicide by hanging himself with shoelaces and a cord from the trousers of a tracksuit
Jean Genet, ex-convict and novelist, whose works address prison life (among other topics)
Seth Morgan, ex-convict and novelist, whose book addresses prison life and San Francisco's criminal counterculture

References

Further reading
Fuchs, Christian [1996] (2002). Bad Blood''. Creation Books.

External links

Comment from Ivan Fisher, attorney for Abbott, following conviction
New York Times article about Abbott from 1981, written before his return to prison.

1944 births
2002 suicides
American bank robbers
American convicts who became writers
American escapees
American people convicted of manslaughter
American people convicted of murder
American people of Chinese descent
American people of Irish descent
American people who died in prison custody
Murderers who committed suicide in prison custody
Fugitives
People convicted of forgery
People from Oscoda, Michigan
Prisoners who died in New York (state) detention
Suicides by hanging in New York (state)
Writers from Michigan
2002 deaths